Union of the Baltic Cities (UBC) is a voluntary, proactive network mobilizing the shared potential of the member cities for democratic, economic, social, cultural and environmentally sustainable development of the Baltic Sea region.

Origins 
The Union of the Baltic Cities was founded in Gdańsk, Poland in September 1991, by 32 cities, with the aim of developing cooperation and exchange between its member cities. Inspired in part by the historic example of the Hanseatic League and supported by the European Union's Interreg programs to stimulate regional cooperation within the EU, it was one of the first formal institutions established to bolster the Baltic as a cohesive region within Europe. The cities of Gdańsk in Poland and Kalmar in Sweden took the initiative in founding the organization, but Gdańsk was chosen as the organization's headquarters to emphasize the desire to break down historic barriers between Western and Eastern Europe.  Anders Engström,  who was in office from 1999 to 2001, was the first President of the UBC.  Per Boedker Andersen was the UBC President in the term 2001–2019. Since 2019 the office has been held by Mantas Jurgutis.

Aims 
The Union states its aims are to:

 Promote, develop and strengthen cooperation and exchange of experience among the cities in the Baltic Sea Region, 
 Advocate for common interests of the local authorities in the region, 
 Act on behalf of the cities and local authorities in common matters towards regional, national, European and international bodies, 
 Strive to achieve sustainable development and optimal economic and social development in the Baltic Sea Region with full respect to European principles of local and regional self-governance and subsidiarity.
 Contribute to joint Baltic identity, cohesion and common understanding in the region.

Status
The Union gathers the cities from ten Baltic Sea countries: Denmark, Estonia, Finland, Germany, Latvia, Lithuania, Norway, Poland, and Sweden.

References

Organizations established in 1991
Local government organizations
Baltic Sea